Joan Maetsuycker (14 October 1606 – 24 January 1678) was the Governor of Zeylan during the Dutch period in Ceylon, and Governor-General of the Dutch East Indies from 1653 to 1678.

Early life and education
Joan Maetsuycker was born in Amsterdam on 14 October 1606.

He studied law in Leuven, and was a lawyer first in The Hague, and later in Amsterdam.

Career
From 1636, Maetsuycker lived in the Dutch East Indies. He was appointed as Governor of Zeylan on 24 March 1646 and was governor until 26 February 1650. He was succeeded by Jacob van Kittensteyn. He was the third Dutch governor of Zeylan.

Seven years later, in 1657 he became the Governor-General of the Dutch East Indies. He stayed on that post for 25 years, which is the longest period for any governor-general. The Dutch colony in the Indies flourished under Maetsuycker. Under his rule, the Portuguese lost Ceylon (1658), the coast of Coromandel (1658) and Malabar (1663); Makassar was conquered (1667), the west coast of Sumatra was occupied, and the first expedition to the interior of Java was held.

As Governor-General of the Dutch East Indies, he also issued edicts in the Dutch Cape Colony, including one in 1657 which allowed those Muslims brought from the Dutch East Indies to the Cape as servants or slaves to practise their religion, but not in public. They were also prohibited from attempting to convert anyone, on pain of death.

Personal life
In 1663 Maetsuycker's wife, Haesje Berckmans, died. In 1664, he married the 24-year-old Elisabeth Abbema, daughter of the preacher Fredericus Abbema and widow of Simon Cos, governor of  Ambon.  In 1671 the splendour-loving Elisabeth caused some controversy when she had gold coins imported from [apan, outside of the rule of the Dutch East India Company (VOC). Her aim was to have her brother-in-law in Suratte buy them.

He died on 4 January 1678 in Batavia, Dutch East Indies.

References

1606 births
1678 deaths
Dutch East India Company people from Amsterdam
17th-century Dutch colonial governors
Governors of Dutch Ceylon
Governors-General of the Dutch East Indies